Claudio Inella (born November 26, 1990) is an Uruguayan footballer who plays as a midfielder for Huracan Buceo.

References

External links

1990 births
Living people
Uruguayan footballers
Uruguayan expatriate footballers
Club Atlético River Plate (Montevideo) players
Tacuarembó F.C. players
Sud América players
C.A. Cerro players
Deportivo Maldonado players
C.D. Malacateco players
Uruguayan Primera División players
Uruguayan Segunda División players
Liga Nacional de Fútbol de Guatemala players
Association football forwards
Footballers from Paysandú
Expatriate footballers in Guatemala
Uruguayan expatriate sportspeople in Guatemala